Tilloclytus cleroides is a species of longhorn beetle in the Cerambycinae subfamily. It was described by White in 1855. It is known from Colombia and Venezuela.

References

Anaglyptini
Beetles described in 1855